This is a list of notable software for version control.

Local data model 
In the local-only approach, all developers must use the same file system.

Open source 
 Revision Control System (RCS) – stores the latest version and backward deltas for fastest access to the trunk tip compared to SCCS and an improved user interface, at the cost of slow branch tip access and missing support for included/excluded deltas.
 Source Code Control System (SCCS) – part of UNIX; based on interleaved deltas, can construct versions as arbitrary sets of revisions. Extracting an arbitrary version takes essentially the same time and is thus more useful in environments that rely heavily on branching and merging with multiple "current" and identical versions.

Client-server model 
In the client-server model, developers use a shared single repository.

Open source 
 Concurrent Versions System (CVS) – originally built on RCS, licensed under the GPL.
 CVSNT – cross-platform port of CVS that allows case insensitive file names among other changes
 OpenCVS – unreleased CVS clone under the BSD license, with emphasis put on security and source code correctness
 Subversion (SVN) – versioning control system inspired by CVS
 Vesta – build system with a versioning file system and support for distributed repositories

Proprietary 
 AccuRev – source configuration management tool with integrated issue tracking based on "Streams" that efficiently manages parallel and global development; replication server is also available. Now owned by Micro Focus.
 Autodesk Vault – Version control tool specifically designed for Autodesk applications managing the complex relationships between design files such as AutoCAD and Autodesk Inventor.
 CADES - Designer productivity and version control system by International Computers Limited.
 Dimensions CM - software change and configuration management system developed by Micro Focus, formerly Serena Software, that includes revision control.
 Helix Core, formerly Perforce Helix - for large scale development environments
 IBM Configuration Management Version Control (CMVC) – version control system, no longer available.
 IBM Rational ClearCase – MSSCCI compliant (Source Control Plug-in API) configuration management system by IBM Rational Software
 IBM Rational Synergy – MSSCCI compliant (Source Control Plug-in API) integrated change management and task-based configuration management system, proprietary of IBM.
 IBM Rational Team Concert – Collaboration and application lifecycle management platform by IBM Rational Software
 IC Manage Global Design Platform (GDP) – design data management for IC design and Perforce infrastructure support.
 Panvalet - Around since the 1970s, source and object control for IBM mainframe computers.
 PTC Integrity (Formerly MKS Integrity).
 PVCS – originally Polytron Version Control System, developed by Don Kinzer at Polytron, first released in 1985. Now owned by Micro Focus.
 Quma Version Control System
 Razor (configuration management), integrated suite from Visible Systems
 StarTeam – coordinates and manages software delivery process by Micro Focus, formerly Borland; centralized control of digital assets and activities
 Surround SCM – version control tool by Seapine Software.
 Team Foundation Version Control  - version control system developed by Microsoft for Team Foundation Server, now Azure DevOps Server
 Vault – version control tool by SourceGear (First installation can be used for free)
 Visual SourceSafe – version control tool by Microsoft; oriented toward small teams

Distributed model 
In the distributed approach, each developer works directly with their own local repository, and changes are shared between repositories as a separate step.

Open source 
 ArX – written by Walter Landry,   started as a fork of GNU arch, but has been completely rewritten
 Bazaar – written in Python, originally by Martin Pool and sponsored by Canonical; decentralised, and aims to be fast and easy to use; can losslessly import Arch archives. It was replaced by a friendly fork called Breezy.
 BitKeeper – was used in Linux kernel development (2002 – April 2005) until its license was revoked for breach of contract. It was open-sourced in 2016 in an attempt to broaden its appeal again.
 Darcs – written in Haskell and originally developed by David Roundy; can keep track of inter-patch dependencies and automatically rearrange and "cherry-pick" them using a "theory of patches"
 DCVS – decentralized and CVS-based
 Fossil – written  by D. Richard Hipp for SQLite; distributed revision control, wiki, bug-tracking, and forum (all-in-one solution) with console and web interfaces. Single portable executable and single repository file.
 Git – written in a collection of Perl, C, and various shell scripts, designed by Linus Torvalds based on the needs of the Linux kernel project; decentralized, and aims to be fast, flexible, and robust
 GNU arch
 Mercurial – written in Python as an Open Source replacement to BitKeeper; decentralized and aims to be fast, lightweight, portable, and easy to use
 Monotone – developed by the Monotone Team; decentralized in a peer-to-peer way
 Pijul (https://pijul.org/) - Free and open source (GPL 2) distributed version control system based on a theory of patches and written in Rust

Proprietary 
 Code Co-op – peer-to-peer version control system (can use e-mail for synchronization)
 Sun WorkShop TeamWare – designed by Larry McVoy, creator of BitKeeper
 Plastic SCM – by Codice Software, Inc

See also 
 Comparison of version-control software
 Comparison of source-code-hosting facilities

References

External links 
 

 List of version control software
Version control software